Tugny-et-Pont is a commune in the Aisne department in Hauts-de-France in northern France.

Population

See also
Communes of the Aisne department
List of medieval bridges in France

References

Communes of Aisne
Aisne communes articles needing translation from French Wikipedia